This is a list of films which placed number one at the weekly box office in France during 2015. The weeks start on Wednesdays, and finish on Tuesdays. The box-office number one is established in terms of tickets sold during the week.

Box office number-one films

Highest-grossing French productions
This is a list of domestic films, released in 2015, that have registered over one million admissions in France.

Notes

References

See also
 List of French films of 2015
 Lists of highest-grossing films in France

France
2015 in French cinema
2015